Fujin Sōgaku Jittai ("Ten physiognomies of women") and Fujo Ninsō Juppin ("Ten classes of women's physiognomy") are the titles of what may have been two series of ukiyo-e prints designed by the Japanese artist Utamaro and published .  Only five prints from one series and four from the other survive, and one print appears in both series, so that eight distinct prints are known.  The two series may have been made up of the same prints, or they may have been the same series with a title change partway through publication.

Utamaro had another series published  titled Fujin Sōgaku Jittai.  This series is made of different prints from the earlier one, and is known to have had all ten prints in the set published.

Background

Ukiyo-e art flourished in Japan during the Edo period from the 17th to 19th centuries, and took as its primary subjects courtesans, kabuki actors, and others associated with the "floating world" lifestyle of the pleasure districts. Alongside paintings, mass-produced woodblock prints were a major form of the genre. In the mid-18th century full-colour  prints became common, printed using a large number of woodblocks, one for each colour.

Kitagawa Utamaro (–1806) made his name in the 1790s with his bijin ōkubi-e ("large-headed pictures of beautiful women") portraits, focusing on the head and upper torso, a style others had previously employed in portraits of kabuki actors.  Utamaro experimented with line, colour, and printing techniques to bring out subtle differences in the features, expressions, and backdrops of subjects from a wide variety of class and background.  Utamaro's individuated beauties were in sharp contrast to the stereotyped, idealized images that had been the norm.

series

The prints are ōkubi bijin-ga "large-head" bust portraits of female beauties in ōban-size (about ).  They are amongst the earliest of Utamaro's  ōkubi bijin-ga, and amongst the earliest of his works to use kirazuri—the application of mica dust to the backgrounds to create a glittering effect.  The prints are considered some of the best representations of Utamaro's work.  The multicolour nishiki-e prints were published  by Tsutaya Jūzaburō.

The series titles declare ten prints in each set. Five are known from Fujin Sōgaku Jittai and four from Fujo Ninsō Juppin; the print Popen o Fuku Musume appears in both series, suggesting the two series may have been made up of the same prints.

On the Fujo Ninsō Juppin prints Utamaro signs himself sōmi Utamaro kōga ("thoughtfully drawn by Utamaro the physiognomist").  Only Uwaki no Sō and Omoshiroki Sō have their titles on the prints; the rest have a blank space where the title would be.  It is not known why, but has been speculated that the titles may have been removed after the first few in response to some complaint, and that perhaps further complaints led to a change in the title of the series as well, possibly over the use of the specialized term sōgaku.

This has to do with Sōgaku, a pseudoscience by which it was believed an analysis of facial features ("physignomy") could reveal personality traits. Texts were published at the time on these analyses. Utamaro's analyses were not based on these observations, but rather on allusions to other books, such as the illustrated story by Santō Kyōden of a prostitute disguised as a dancer, and an erotic book illustrated by Utamaro and Katsukawa Shunchō called Ehon Hime Hajime ("Picture Book: First-Time Princesses", 1790), in which facial types are compared to the aspects of the sexual organs. Viewers likely were aware of the allusions of the prints to these books.

Eiji Yoshida recorded the title of another print in the Fujo Ninsō Juppin series, Kasō no Bijin no Hanshin Zu ("Half-length picture of lower-class beauty"), in the last volume of Ukiyo-e Jiten, but no details of its composition are known. Yoshida also noted that a catalogue from 1915 for the  trading company lists a Chawan o Noseta Chataku o Motsu Onna ("Woman holding a saucer with a teacup on it") from the Fujin Sōgaku Jittai series. As these prints cannot be confirmed, there remains the possibility that the series remained unfinished after the publication of the eight known prints. Yoshida suggests there may really have been two series: Fujo Ninsō Juppin was left incomplete after five prints, and Fujin Sōgaku Jittai followed but was also left complete.

Uwaki no Sō

In Uwaki no Sō a young woman—most likely in her 20s—is dressed carelessly in a yukata, with her head turned behind her, looking outside the picture.  She is probably returning from a sentō bath.  She wipes her hands with a cloth draped over her right shoulder.

In modern Japanese, uwaki usually means "sexual unfaithfulness"; less often it means "lively" or "frivolous", or indicates a showy disposition.  In Utamaro's time the word referred to a flighty personality apt to follow fads and fashions.

The woman has a kanzashi hairpin and a comb placed casually in her hair.  She has her mouth open slightly, as if she were about to speak, and has a seductive look in her eyes.  The background is dusted with muscovite, a variety of mica, which produces a glittering effect.  The vegetable pigments have faded from their original colours; the kimono was most likely a pale blue.

Omoshiroki Sō

In Omoshiroki Sō ("The Interesting Type"), a woman looks in a mirror in her right hand.  She examines her teeth, which have been blackened with ohaguro, which normally only married women applied.  Women applying ohaguro are normally depicted with the mirror in the left hand and the ohaguro brush in the right.

Utamaro uses a limited number of colours in this print, which gives the impression of a dim interior scene.

Tabako no Kemuri o Fuku Onna

In Tabako no Kemuri o Fuku Onna ("Woman blowing tobacco smoke"), Utamaro depicts a young woman holding a kiseru tobacco pipe.  She sits in a decadent posture with her kimono open, exposing her breasts, and her hair is coming untied.  The pipe rests on her fourth and fifth fingers, with her thumb at the end on her index and middle finger holding it on top.  She blows a puff of smoke rendered with karasuri embossing against the mica-dusted background.

Uchiwa o Sakasa ni Motsu Onna

In Uchiwa o Sakasa ni Motsu Onna ("Woman holding a hand-fan upside-down"), a young woman holds a round uchiwa hand fan upside-down with both hands, possible turning it in circles; she appears lost in thought.

A finely-patterned obi sash that wraps around her light, summer  haori, a kimono-like jacket.  The grey haori is of silk gauze, and its sleeves have slid down the woman's arms, revealing their white skin at the centre of the composition.  Five-leafed ivy mon crests adorn the kimono, as well as a three-leafed ivy crest on the fan, signifying this is Naniwa O-Kita, a famed teahouse girl who appeared in many prints by Utamaro and others.

Yubi-ori Kazoeru Onna

In Yubi-ori Kazoeru Onna ("Woman counting with her fingers"), a woman counts something on the fingers of her right hand.  Her left hand is on her obi sash, and her posture and facial expression suggest she is thinking seriously about something.

In Japanese yubi-ori kazoeru ("count by bending fingers") refers to a style of finger counting by which a person begins with the hand open and counts by folding inward first the thumb ("one"), then from the index finger to the baby finger.

Sensu o Mochi Higasa o Sasu Onna

In the brightly-coloured Sensu o Mochi Higasa o Sasu Onna ("Woman holding a hand-fan and parasol"), a woman stands in a leisurely, relaxed posture carryin a parasol and hand fan and wearing an age-bōshi head-dress to keep dirt from the hair.  This was a popular summer fashion with women during the Kansei era.

Fumi Yomu Onna

In Fumi Yomu Onna ("Woman reading a letter"), a woman reads what is almost certainly a love letter, per the expectations in ukiyo-e.  Expectations would also predict the recipient to be a courtesan or young girl, but the woman's shaven eyebrows and teeth blackened with ohaguro show that she is married.  She holds the letter close to her eyes and probably reads it secretly and in low light.  The arch in her posture and her squeezing grip on the letter suggest a conflicted emotional state brought on by a likely tangled relationship.

Popen o Fuku Musume

In Popen o Fuku Musume ("Young woman blowing a poppen glass"), a young woman plays with a —a glass toy that changes sounds depending on whether the breath is blown or sucked through it; the change makes an onomatopoeic po–pen sound.  It was an exotic type of toy a sheltered girl from a respectable family could have innocent fun with; she is likely the daughter of a wealthy merchant family.  To Japanese art historian Tadashi Kobayshi, "Utamaro has marvelously captured her just when she seems about to achieve a more mature, voluptuous beauty but has yet to lose the innocence and naïveté of childhood.

The young woman wears a furisode—a type of kimono worn by young unmarried women.  It has a design of scattered cherry blossoms over a red-and-white checkered pattern.

series

Late in his career, Utamaro had another series published in  titled Fujin Sōgaku Jittai.  Whereas the older series appears to have been left incomplete, the latter series has a full ten prints.  Each comes with a description in its rebus and is signed Kansō Utamaro ("Utamaro the Physiognomist").

The vertical ōban-size, full-colour nishiki-e prints were published by two firms: those of Tsuruya Kiemon and Yamashiroya Tōemon.  The prints issue by Yamashiro have a red outline around the title cartouche and bear his mark .

The prints do not bear the titles listed below; they are provided by art historians, and sometimes differ, both in English and Japanese.

Chōchin wo Motsu Onna

Chōchin wo Motsu Onna ("Woman holding a paper lamp")

Kamisuki

In Kamisuki ("Combing the hair"), a woman washes and combs her hair over a washbasin.  Her nude upper body is exposed.  The inscription reads:

Kanetsuke

 Kanetsuke ("Applying ohaguro")

Enkan wo Motsu Onna

Enkan wo Motsu Onna ("Woman holding a pipe")

Kazaguruma

Kazaguruma ("Pinwheel")

Mayusori

Mayusori ("Shaving eyebrows")

Usu wo Hiku Onna

In Usu wo Hiku Onna ("Woman grinding a mortar"), also called Hiki-usu ("stone mortar; millstone"), a woman with her hair wrapped in a towel works a millstone while laughing at something.  The inscription reads:

Nozoki-megane

In Nozoki-megane ("Peep-box"), also called Kawayurashiki no sō, a woman looks inside a magic lantern–like device.  The inscription reads:

Fumi-kakushi

Fumi-kakushi ("Hiding a letter")

Fumi-yomi

Fumi-yomi ("Reading a letter")

Notes

References

Works cited

 
 
 
 
 
 
 
 
 
 
 
 
 
 
 

Works by Kitagawa Utamaro